Mahendranagar (Nepali: महेन्द्रनगर) officially known as Bhimdattanagar (Nepali:भिमदत्त), is a municipality in Kanchanpur District of Sudurpashchim Province, Nepal.  The city and the municipality were named Mahendranagar in the honour of late King Mahendra of Nepal. After becoming a republic in 2008, the Mahendranagar municipality name was changed to Bhimdatta municipality in honour of the revolutionary farmer leader Bhimdatta Panta. It is surrounded by Bedkot Municipality in the east, Dadeldhura District in the north, Shuklaphanta National Park in the south and Uttarakhand, India in the west.

Mahendranagar is the 9th largest city in Nepal. At the time of the 1991 Nepal census, it had a population of 62,050. According to the census of 2001, the city's population was 80,839. Bhimdatta is a hub of activity for industries running between India and Nepal. It is also a gateway to Shuklaphanta National Park, formerly Shuklaphanta Wildlife Reserve.

Society
The indigenous people living here are the Rana-Tharus but people from other parts mostly from the hill districts Baitadi, Darchula and Dadeldhura find themselves at home. Bhimdatta has become a unique combination of ethnic groups which has a different way of life within an already diverse country Nepal. The festivals celebrated by the ethnic Tharu people are Holi and Maghi. Tharu people celebrate Maghi as New year, while Hill People primarily celebrate Gora (commonly called Gaura Parba). Deepawali or Diwali or Tihar is a major festival which is celebrated with Laxmi Puja, Gai Puja, and Bhai Tika on their respective days. Dashain is also a major festival here. Small population from western Nepal mainly arghakhachi, gulmi, pyuthan etc have settled here (mostly in bhasi), even before local people of the same region settled from the hills of Far-west Nepal.

Services
Bhimdatta is the business and educational hub of the Mahakali Zone. Since it is in close proximity to the border with India, Bhimdattaa plays a major role in trade in the region. Students from neighbouring districts come for education. Far-western University, which teaches diversified disciplines ranging from economics to the humanities to the sciences, is the only university in the city. People here are mainly occupied by agriculture as Nepal is an agrarian society. Business is another source of empowering the local economy which is concentrated in the bazaar area of Bhimdatta. Government services is a significant part of the economy. Being comparatively closer to the major industrial areas of India, Mahendranagar could serve as a portal for industrial exchange between India and Nepal.

Transport and communication
Nepal Telecom and Ncell provide 3G and 4G facilities in the area. Bhimdatta is connected to other parts of Nepal by East-West Highway which is the only road which connects it to the rest of Nepal. There is a domestic airport in Bhimdatta which is out of service. Bus service connects Bhimdatta to all the other parts of the country. There is a customs post for goods and third country nationals, while Indian and Nepalese nationals may cross the border freely. Banbasa, Uttarakhand state, India is the other side of the border.  Bhimdatta is the nearest place in Nepal to Uttrakhanda, part of India.  Bhimdatta is also connected by sub-highways to hill towns Dipayal, Baitadi, Amargadhi, and Darchula.

Education
Florida International Boarding Higher Secondary School

Adarsh Vidya Niketan
Bal jagreeti secondary school
Diamond Public Higher Secondary School
Everest Evergreen English school
Ghatal higher secondary school
Holi Family English Boarding School
International Public Higher Secondary School
Kanchan Vidya Mandir
Little Buddha Academy]
Mahakali Modern Public School
Oxford National Academy
Radient Secondary School
Rastriya Bal Vidhyalaya
Rauleshwar Multiple Campus Beldandi
Shree Shishya English Boarding school
Shree Siddhanath Science Campus
Sunrise Public Higher Secondary School
United public higher secondary school
Morning Glory higher secondary school Janaki Tole
Shree Jaycees Secondary School Rajipur
Sikhar Academy Rajipur
Shree Siddhanath Science Campus is the first Science Campus in Mahendranagar and was established in 2033 B.S. It is a constituent campus of Tribhuvan University.

Tourism

Lingaa
Shuklaphanta National Park
Jhilmila Lake
Bedkot Lake
Vishnu Temple
Dodhara Chandani Suspension Bridge
Bhimdatta Memorial Park
Kalikich Lake
Banda Lake
Siddhanath Temple
Mahendranagar is a beautiful city from a tourist point of view. There are natural, religious and historical areas here. Chure (चुरे) is connected to the east-west spread in the north. At the foot of the same Chure are the beautiful villages of Rautela (राउटेला) and Barakunda (बाराकुण्डा). Rautela temple (राउटेला मन्दिर) in Rautela and Bishnu temple (बिष्णु मन्दिर), Linga (लिंगा धाम), Shiva temple etc. are the major religious places here.
Dodhara Chandani is one of the famous bridge.
Jhilmila Lake (झिलिमिला ताल) and Bedkot Lake (बेदकोट ताल) are famous lakes. There are further more areas for tourists.

Media
To promote local culture Bhimdatta has many radio stations:
 Radio Mahakali 96.2 MHz
 Shuklaphanta FM 94.4 MHz 
 Radio Nagarik FM 104.3 MHz

References

Populated places in Kanchanpur District
Transit and customs posts along the India–Nepal border
Points for exit and entry of nationals from third countries along the India–Nepal border
Nepal municipalities established in 1977
Municipalities in Kanchanpur District